The Entrance is an electoral district of the Legislative Assembly located on the Central Coast of New South Wales, Australia.

The Entrance represents the towns and suburbs of Bateau Bay, Berkeley Vale, Blue Bay, Fountaindale, Glenning Valley, Kangy Angy, Killarney Vale, Lisarow, Long Jetty, Mount Elliot, Niagara Park, Ourimbah, Shelly Beach, Somersby, The Entrance, The Entrance North, Toowoon Bay, Tuggerah, Tumbi Umbi and Wyoming.

Members for The Entrance

Election results

References

The Entrance
1988 establishments in Australia
The Entrance
Central Coast (New South Wales)